Being one of the strongest municipalities for parties of the traditional red bloc, Jacob Bundsgaard from the Social Democrats, who had been mayor since 2014, was expected to be re-elected in this election. In the campaign before the election, Jacob Bundsgaard did remarkably not include his party logo or name on his election posters.

However, he would still suffer seat losses similar to those the Social Democrats
saw in all 4 largest municipalities of Denmark in the 2021 Danish local elections.

As in the 2017 Aarhus municipal election, Jacob Bundsgaard became the person to receive the most personal votes in Denmark as a whole, however he received only 19,279 compared to 39,841 in 2017.

Despite being the biggest party, the Social Democrats lost 3 seats, but the parties of the traditional red bloc won 20 of the 31 seats, and it was later announced that Jacob Bundsgaard would continue as mayor.

Electoral system
For elections to Danish municipalities, a number varying from 9 to 31 are chosen to be elected to the municipal council. The seats are then allocated using the D'Hondt method and a closed list proportional representation.
Aarhus Municipality had 31 seats in 2021

Unlike in Danish General Elections, in elections to municipal councils, electoral alliances are allowed.

Electoral alliances  

Electoral Alliance 1

Electoral Alliance 2

Electoral Alliance 3

Results

Notes

References 

Aarhus